The Sun Trapp is a gay bar and nightclub in Salt Lake City, Utah, United States. The Sun Trapp closed for 42 days and had to restructure staff shifts during the COVID-19 pandemic. Half of staff were laid off. The business joined a lawsuit to challenge alcohol sales rules during the pandemic.

References

External links

 
 The Sun Trapp at Salt Lake City Weekly

LGBT drinking establishments in the United States
LGBT culture in Utah
Nightclubs in the United States